The Laval Castle (in French: Château de Laval) is a castle located in Laval, in the French department of Mayenne. Its foundation in the 10th century allowed the birth of the city. Emblematic monument of Laval, it occupies a rocky promontory above the Mayenne River. It is composed of two distinct ensembles: the Old Castle (in French: Vieux-Château), which corresponds to the medieval fortified castle, and the New Castle (in French: Château-Neuf), a Renaissance gallery transformed into a courthouse in the 19th century. These two monuments are on the list of the first 1,034 French historical monuments classified in 1840.

The history of the Château de Laval is closely linked to that of the House of Laval, which began with Guy I, the founder of the castle. The monument bears witness to the multiple alliances contracted by this family, as well as to its power, which grew from the 11th century until its disappearance at the end of the Renaissance. The Old Castle is remarkable for its 11th century chapel as well as for its imposing main tower, topped by a 13th century wooden hoarding, an exceptional example of medieval military architecture. The richly worked bays of the medieval dwellings, built in the early 16th century, and the gallery of the Château-Neuf, dating from the 1540s, are striking elements of the Renaissance that show the evolution of architecture at that time.

Since the relocation of the judicial services in the 2000s, the Château-Neuf has been awaiting reconversion. The Old Castle, which served as a prison from the Revolution to 1911, has been open to the public since the 1920s. Initially devoted to archaeology, natural history and decorative arts, it has been home to the Musée d'Art naïf et d'Arts singuliers de Laval since 1967. This museum presents works by numerous artists representative of Naive art and Art Singulier.

See also 

 List of castles in France

Bibliographic sources 

 Samuel Chollet, Stéphane Hiland et Sébastien Legros, « Les châteaux du Moyen-Âge en Mayenne », Société d’Archéologie et d’Histoire de la Mayenne, 2017
 Antoinette Le Falher, « Musée art naïf, arts singuliers : guide du visiteur », Ville de Laval, 2016
 Jean-Michel Gousset et Samuel Chollet, « Laval. Nouvelle datation dendrochronologique de la tour maîtresse du château et de son hourd », Bulletin Monumental,‎ 2012
 Samuel Chollet, « L'accès au donjon du château de Laval », La Mayenne, Archéologie, Histoire,‎ 2006
 Malcolm Walsby, « Vivre à la cour des comtes de Laval », La Mayenne, Archéologie, Histoire,‎ 2006
 Séverine Guillotte, « Un mécénat de transition », La Mayenne, Archéologie, Histoire,‎ 2006
 Jean-Michel Gousset et Samuel Chollet, « Mayenne. Laval, datation dendrochronologique des hourds du donjon », Bulletin Monumental,‎ 2006
 Xavier Villebrun, « Un emblème pour la ville de Laval », La Mayenne, Archéologie, Histoire,‎ 2004
 Estelle Fresneau, « Laval : des musées pour un château », La Mayenne, Archéologie, Histoire,‎ 2004
 Antoinette Le Falher, « Le château de Laval vu par le 19e siècle », La Mayenne, Archéologie, Histoire,‎ 2004
 Jean-Michel Gousset, « Y a-t-il deux donjons au château de Laval ? », La Mayenne, Archéologie, Histoire,‎ 2004
 Armelle Pain, Marylène Cudeville et Valérie Mansard, Le patrimoine des communes de la Mayenne », vol. 2, Flohic, 2002
 Dominique Eraud, « La galerie des comtes de Laval : vous avez dit Pierre Lescot ? », La Mayenne, Archéologie, Histoire,‎ 2000
 Dominique Eraud, « Le château de Laval. Forteresse et résidence d’agrément », Monuments historiques,‎ 1993
 Gilbert Chaussis, « Laval, de rue en rue », vol. 1, Laval, Siloë, 1991
 Dominique Eraud, « Laval, Mayenne », Paris, Éd. du Patrimoine, 1990
 Dominique Eraud, « Laval : le château : Mayenne / Inventaire général des monuments et des richesses artistiques de la France, région des Pays de la Loire », Association pour le développement de l'Inventaire général en pays de la Loire, 1988
 Éric Mare, « La chapelle du Vieux Château de Laval : les fouilles de 1987 », La Mayenne, Archéologie, Histoire,‎ 1988
 Jacques Naveau, « Données nouvelles sur le château de Laval : les fouilles de 1980 », La Mayenne, Archéologie, Histoire,‎ 1982
 Madeleine Pré, « Les façades sculptées du Château de Laval », Gazette des Beaux-arts,‎ 1962
 Louis-Julien Morin de la Beauluère, « Le château de Laval, Laval », Goupil, 1892

Castles
Castles in France
Castles in Europe